Yaroslav Krushelnitskiy (born 16 March 1983) is an Uzbekistani international football defender who currently plays for Andijan.

Career

FC Shurtan Guzar
He joined FC Shurtan Guzar in 2010 and prolonged his contract with club for another one year.

After the end of 2011 season he moved to Mes Sarcheshmeh of Iran Pro League. In February 2012 he joined FC Shurtan Guzar back.

International
He made his international debut with Uzbekistan in a 0-1 loss against Albania on 8 August 2010. Krushelnitskiy was injured in 2010 and could not participate in the 2011 AFC Asian Cup

References

External links

Yaroslav Krushelnitskiy Player info and statistics at uzfootball.uz 

1983 births
Living people
People from Qashqadaryo Region
Uzbekistani footballers
Uzbekistan international footballers
Expatriate footballers in Iran
Pakhtakor Tashkent FK players
FC Rotor Volgograd players
Russian Premier League players
Uzbekistani expatriate footballers
Expatriate footballers in Russia
Mes Sarcheshme players
Expatriate footballers in Malaysia
Uzbekistani expatriate sportspeople in Iran
Uzbekistani expatriate sportspeople in Russia
Uzbekistani expatriate sportspeople in Malaysia
Association football defenders
Uzbekistani people of Ukrainian descent